Freeflying is a skydiving discipline which began in the late 1980s, involving freefalling in various vertical orientations, as opposed to the traditional "belly-to-earth" orientation. The discipline is known to have originated when Olav Zipser began experimenting with non-traditional forms of bodyflight. Zipser founded the FreeFly Clowns as a two-person competitive team with Mike Vail in 1992. He was joined by Omar Alhegelan (1st ever FAI Freestyle World Cup & World Champion), Charles Bryan, and Stefania Martinengo in 1994. The FreeFly Clowns are also credited with opening the first school to teach freeflying, The First School of Modern SkyFlying.

Freeflying entered the public awareness in 1996 when the SSI Pro Tour added freeflying as a three-person competitive discipline at the second televised event (with Skysurfing), part of ESPN's Destination Extreme series. One-hundred and fifty countries watched the FreeFly Clowns (Olav Zipser, Charles Bryan and Omar Alhegelan) as they took 1st place in all four international competitions along with other teams including: the Flyboyz (Eli Thompson, Mike Ortiz, Knut Krecker, Fritz Pfnür), Team AirTime (Tony Urugallo, Jim O'Reilly, Peter Raymond, Brian Germain), and many other pioneers of freeflying. In 1996 and 1997, the SSI Pro Tour staged eight televised events in both North America and Europe with $36,000 in cash prizes awarded to freefly teams. SSI invited the 1997 Pro World Champions, the Flyboyz, to participate in the 1998 ESPN X Games as an unofficial exhibition.
The resulting global television exposure attracted considerable attention to the FreeFly Clowns, the Flyboyz, and FreeFly as a discipline. A once fledgling offshoot of the mainstream, freeflying now comprises one-half of the overall skydiving community.

Olav Zipser's Space Games used a "space ball" as a research and measuring device to provide a constant speed and direction from which individual athletes could be trained, rated, raced against each other and judged.  The Space Games took FreeFlying to the next level from 1998.

In 2000 FreeFly was accepted as an aviation discipline by the International Parachute Commission (IPC) and the first official FreeFly National Championships were held worldwide.

Explanation
Freeflying is an expansion of skydiving which includes the traditional belly-to-earth positions, but extends into vertical flight where the flyer is in an upright position (falling feet first) or in an inverted position (falling head first). These positions increase freefall speeds and make new types of formations and routines possible.

A freeflyer, in order to fully understand the aerodynamic power of his/her body in freefall, needs to first learn to control all of the skydiving forms: box position (belly-to-earth, traditional skydiving position), back flying (back-to-earth), head-up flying, head-down flying, and side flying. These positions are not held for the duration of a skydive. Freeflying can, and usually does, involve constant transitions in position and speeds, with vertical and horizontal orientations. This can involve constantly flowing skydives, with all positions explored, or more static skydives where flyers are concentrating on building a large formation while flying in one of these freefly positions.

Due to the increased freefall speed and potentially faster horizontal speeds, freeflying has dangers beyond that of a normal skydive. Extra care must be taken for freefall skydive groups to stay away from belly-to-earth skydivers to avoid collisions. Since most parachutes are not designed to be opened at speeds higher than that of normal belly flying, freeflyers must transition back to the "belly to earth" position and slow down their descent for several seconds before deploying their parachute.

While freeflying is a younger and more extreme addition to skydiving, it is becoming a popular event in competitions and world records.

Back flying
Back flying is the ability to fly on the back in a stable and controlled fashion. This skill is critical so that when the flyer flips out of some of the more advanced positions he or she stays in control and does not endanger his- or herself or other skydivers.

Sit flying

Sit flying is called such because it looks similar to the position taken while sitting in a chair.

For flying a sit, the feet are oriented toward the relative wind and 90-degree bends maintained at the knees, hips, and shoulders. To move around, the flyer redirects the airflow in the opposite direction the jumper wants to go.  Newtonian mechanics then push the flyer in the desired direction. Fall rate changes (descending faster or slower) can also be made.

Head down 
A person falling in the head down position has less cross-sectional area exposed to the air while falling, which results in much faster fall rates. Due to the increased speed, every movement made can cause the skydiver to become unstable or disoriented; thus increasing the risk involved in skydiving.

Records 
The world's largest vertical (head down) formation took place on Friday, 31 July 2015, when a multinational team of 164 skydivers, some traveling at speeds of over 200 mph, linked over Skydive Chicago, in Ottawa, Illinois, United States. This broke the previous record of 138 linked skydivers set on Saturday, 4 August 2012 also at Skydive Chicago.

Marc Hauser set the world record for the fastest horizontal free fall at 304 km/h in Empuriabrava, Spain without specialized equipment, in October 2012.

In 2022 skydivers from twenty-two different countries set a new all female head down World record with 80 freeflyers in formation over Eloy USA.  The first attempt at the record jump was scheduled to happen in 2020, the 100th anniversary of women being granted the right to vote, but was postponed due to the covid pandemic.

See also
Vertical formation skydiving
Freestyle skydiving
Freefall
Parachuting
Vertical wind tunnel
Olav Zipser
The First School of Modern SkyFlying
Space Games

References

External links

Air sports
Aerial maneuvers
Aerobatics
Parachuting
History of aviation